San Clemente is a city and commune administered by the municipality of San Clemente, located in the Talca Province of Chile's Maule Region.

Demographics
Of these, 13,398 (36%) lived in urban areas and 23,863 (64%) in rural areas. The population grew by 2.3% (847 persons) between the 1992 and 2002 censuses.

Administration
As a commune, San Clemente is a third-level administrative division of Chile administered by a municipal council, headed by an alcalde who is directly elected every four years. The 2008–2012 alcalde is Oscar Galvez Rebolledo (RN).

Within the electoral divisions of Chile, San Clemente is represented in the Chamber of Deputies by Pablo Lorenzini (PDC) and Pedro Pablo Alvarez-Salamanca (UDI) as part of the 38th electoral district, together with Curepto, Constitución, Empedrado, Pencahue, Maule, Pelarco, Río Claro and San Rafael. The commune is represented in the Senate by Juan Antonio Coloma Correa (UDI) and Andrés Zaldívar Larraín (PDC) as part of the 10th senatorial constituency (Maule-North).

References

Populated places in Talca Province
Communes of Chile